WaterWorks is the former name of several Cedar Fair water parks:

Soak City (Kings Island): Known as WaterWorks from 1989-2004
Soak City (Kings Dominion): Known as WaterWorks from 1999-2014
Carolina Harbor: A water park at Carowinds, known as WaterWorks from 1997-2006

See also
 Waterworks (disambiguation)